Saint Onge (pronounced "saynt AHNJ'") is an unincorporated community and census-designated place (CDP) in Lawrence County, South Dakota, United States. As of the 2020 census, the population was 170.

History
Saint Onge was laid out in 1881. The community was named for Henry St. Onge, a pioneer settler. A post office called Saint Onge has been in operation since 1881. Saint Onge has been assigned the ZIP code of 57779.

Geography
St. Onge is in northeastern Lawrence County, along South Dakota Highway 34, which leads northwest  to Belle Fourche and southeast  to Interstate 90 at Whitewood.

False Bottom Creek forms the western edge of the community, and its tributary Dry Creek forms the northeastern edge. False Bottom Creek flows northwest to the Redwater River, which in turn is a tributary of the Belle Fourche River, flowing east to the Missouri.

Demographics

References

Census-designated places in Lawrence County, South Dakota
Census-designated places in South Dakota
Unincorporated communities in Lawrence County, South Dakota
Unincorporated communities in South Dakota